The Pakistan cricket team toured England in the 1978 season to play a three-match Test series against England. England won the series 2-0 with 1 match drawn.

Test series summary

First Test

Second Test

Third Test

One Day Internationals (ODIs)

England won the Prudential Trophy 2-0.

1st ODI

2nd ODI

External sources
 CricketArchive – tour itineraries

Annual reviews
 Playfair Cricket Annual 1979
 Wisden Cricketers' Almanack 1979

1978 in English cricket
1978
International cricket competitions from 1975–76 to 1980
1978 in cricket